Romain "Reindert" Henri Theodor David de Favauge (22 December 1872 – 8 October 1949) was a Dutch sport shooter who competed at the 1908 Summer Olympics and the 1920 Summer Olympics. He was born in Bergen op Zoom and died in Bloemendaal.

In 1908 he finished fourth with the Dutch team in the team trap shooting event. In the individual trap competition he finished 22nd. Twelve years later he finished sixth as a member of the Dutch team in the team clay pigeons event.

References

External links
list of Dutch shooters

1872 births
1949 deaths
Dutch male sport shooters
Olympic shooters of the Netherlands
Shooters at the 1908 Summer Olympics
Shooters at the 1920 Summer Olympics
Trap and double trap shooters
Sportspeople from Bergen op Zoom